Beline Uwineza is a Rwandan politician, currently a member of the Chamber of Deputies in the Parliament of Rwanda.

References 

Members of the Chamber of Deputies (Rwanda)